Conus hughmorrisoni is a species of sea snail, a marine gastropod mollusc in the family Conidae, the cone snails, cone shells or cones.

These snails are predatory and venomous. They are capable of "stinging" humans.

Description
The size of the shell varies between 10 mm and 21 mm.

Distribution
This marine species occurs off New Ireland, Papua New Guinea

References

  Lorenz F. & Puillandre N. (2015). Conus hughmorrisoni, a new species of cone snail from New Ireland, Papua New Guinea (Gastropoda: Conidae). European Journal of Taxonomy. 129: 1-15

External links
 To World Register of Marine Species
 

hughmorrisoni
Gastropods described in 2015